Giles Weather Station (also referred to as Giles Meteorological Station or Giles) is located in Western Australia near the Northern Territory border, about  west-south-west of Alice Springs and  west of Uluru. This means it plays an important role as a weather and climate observatory for the country, particularly eastern and southeastern Australia, and particularly for rainfall predictions. The station is on the Great Central Road and the nearest township is the Warakurna Aboriginal settlement (population 180),  North. Giles is within the Shire of Ngaanyatjarraku and is in the foothills of the Rawlinson Ranges.

A staff of three operates the remote station on six-monthly tours.
Giles Airport, a  airstrip services the station and the Warakurna community.

Tourists are invited to watch the daily release of weather balloons and browse through the Visitor's Centre. Station tours are no longer conducted on a regular basis.

History
Giles is named after English explorer Ernest Giles, the first European to travel through the area in 1874.

Surveyor and roadbuilder Len Beadell, who worked for the Weapons Research Establishment (now known as the Defence Science and Technology Group), selected the site for a meteorological station in December 1955. It was needed to forecast weather conditions suitable for nuclear weapons testing at Emu Field and Maralinga. The location was strongly opposed by Walter MacDougall since it lay on tribal land. Beadell surveyed and built Giles Airport, and chose the name Giles during construction of the Gunbarrel Highway which links Carnegie Station and Giles.

Later, the weather station provided support for rocket testing programs at Woomera, as Giles was close to the centre-line of fire from the launch site. Wreckage from the first Blue Streak missile, launched from Woomera on 5 June 1964, is on display at the station.

Overcrowding there and at Warburton created a need for a new community which became Warakurna in the mid-1970s.

In 1972 control of the station was transferred from the Department of Defence to the Bureau of Meteorology.

A Landline story in 2018 stated that Giles would soon become the last mainland regional weather station to be permanently staffed, with all the others being automated.

Climate
Giles is in an area that has a desert climate (Köppen climate classification BWh) with hot summers and mild winters. The periodic southward movement of the monsoon trough and ex-tropical cyclones cause heavy rain events in the wetter months from November to March. Dry spells often occur, particularly in winter; the longest period without rain was 125 days from 17 May to 21 September 1961.

References

External links

Gazetteer of Australia
Giles: Australia's most remote weather station

Meteorological stations
Shire of Ngaanyatjarraku
Bureau of Meteorology